Kemlya (Kemlä) is a rural locality (a selo) and the administrative center of Ichalkovsky District of the Republic of Mordovia, Russia. Population:

References

Notes

Sources

Rural localities in Mordovia
Ichalkovsky District
Lukoyanovsky Uyezd